Fantasia was a Brazilian television program hosted by several female models on SBT. Based on the Italian television program “Non è la RAI”, it was an entertainment program in which people could participate in several games and earn money by phoning the program. It debuted on December 1, 1997. Many models from the program continued their career on TV.

History of the Program

First Season (1997–1998)

The first season, which was the most successful one, debuted on December 1, 1997, at 4:30 pm. It was hosted by Adriana Colin, Débora Rodrigues, Jackeline Petkovic and Valéria Balbi, and directed by Paulo Santoro. In March 1998, Valéria Balbi left the program and the former dancers Amanda Françozo and Tânia Mara became hosts. The first season of the program ended on August 15, 1998. The official announcement of the cancellation of the program happened one day before its end. The reason why the program was canceled was that, since the month of April, the audience rate had been decreasing.

Second Season (1998–1999)

On November 1, 1998, the program was back on Sundays, at midday, and it was hosted by Carla Perez.

The program had some changes. The main change was the inclusion of musical attractions in addition to the games. Carla Perez also used to dance with her guests. The program was canceled again in August 1999.

Third Season (2000)

On January 8, 2000, the program is back on the schedule of SBT, on Saturdays, from 2:15 pm to 7:20 pm. It was hosted by Celso Portiolli, Márcia Goldschmidt, Christina Rocha, Otávio Mesquita and Lu Barsoti.

The program kept the same background and some of the dancers. It was canceled on June 10, 2000.

Fourth Season (2007–2008)

On Tuesday, October 30, 2007, the program is back from 1:00 am to 3:00 am, being hosted by Helen Ganzarolli, Caco Rodrigues and Luiz Bacci. On the second day, Bacci had already left the program, which was then hosted only by Helen and Caco.

In the fourth season, the format remained similar to the one of the previous seasons. The main changes were the reduction of the quantity of dancers (the number was reduced from 75 to 35 girls) and their clothes (in the three previous seasons, they wore shorts and colored shirts; in the fourth season, they wore bikinis).

Between December 24 and January 12, due to Christmas and New Year seasons, the program ran in the afternoon, at 3:00 pm, and the length of the program was reduced to one hour. On January 14, the program started to run during the early hours of the day again, with its normal length of two hours.

On Monday, March 10, 2008, the program was back to the afternoon, starting at 2:00 pm. However, seven days later, the program was canceled.

The fourth season of the program started on Tuesday, October 30, 2007 and ended on Monday, March 17, 2008.

Hosts

 Adriana Colin (1997–1998)
 Débora Rodrigues (1997–1998)
 Jackeline Petkovic (1997–1998)
 Valéria Balbi (1997–1998)
 Amanda Françozo (1998)
 Tânia Mara (1998)
 Carla Perez (1998–1999)
 Celso Portiolli (2000)
 Márcia Goldschmidt (2000)
 Christina Rocha (2000)
 Otávio Mesquita (2000)
 Lu Barsoti (2000)
 Helen Ganzarolli (2007–2008)
 Caco Rodrigues (2007–2008)
 Luiz Bacci (2007)

Directors

 Paulo Santoro - First, second and third seasons.
 Caco Rodrigues - Fourth season.

Fantasia girls (1997–2008)

 Adriana Henriques Nunes
 Alexssandra Lima
 Aline Franco
 Aline Hauck
 Amanda Françozo
 Ana Lívia Montagna
 Ana Luísa (Luisa)
 Ana Rodrigues
 Ana Santiago
 Andressa Modro
 Angela Sanche Artero
 Angélica Baldini
 Ariana Nasi
 Ariane
 Aretha
 Bel
 Bruna Ganzarolli
 Carina Lima
 Carla Castilho
 Carla
 Carol Porcelli
 Carol Lopes
 Cátia Medeiros
 Cátia Verpa
 Cíntia Assis
 Cláudia Garcia
 Cinthia Lee
 Cristiane Sousa
 Cristiane Diniz
 Cristina
 Daiane
 Daiane Amêndola
 Daiane Carnaes
 Dani Sachetti
 Dani Sobreira
 Daniela de Gea
 Daniela Marcondes
 Daniele Fellit
 Danielle França
 Danielle Santos
 Dayse Conrado
 Deborah Abreu
 Débora Settim (the only girl who participated in the four seasons of the program)
 Denise Catão
 Denise Venturine
 Diana Santana
 Diovana
 Ester
 Elisabete Soares (Bete)
 Ellen Roche
 Érica Vieira
 Eveline Paschoalino
 Fabiana Bueno
 Fabiana Almeida
 Fernanda Boaventura (Nanda)
 Fernanda Did
 Fernanda Garcia
 Fernanda Morais
 Fernanda Vasconcellos
 Flávia Andrade
 Flávia Cristina
 Flávia Vega
 Gabriela Roncatti
 Gláucia Dinis
 Giovana Simioni
 Giovanna
 Hellen Pinheiro
 Izabella Camargo
 Ivy Giorge
 Jade Karen
 Jéssica Moreira
 Joyce Ribeiro
 Joyce Hernandes
 Juliana Domingues
 Juliana Kraieski
 Juliana Lima
 Juliana Scodeler
 Julianinha
 Jussara Binotto
 Karen Ern
 Kate Frazão
 Kátia Volkland
 Larissa Guerrero
 Leslie Balzano
 Lídia Dickel
 Lilian Ramos
 Lívia Andrade
 Lívia Lemos
 Luana
 Luane Pellegrino (Lua)
 Luciana Fontes
 Luma Simões
 Marcela Couto
 Mariana Campos (Mari)
 Maryanne Mayumi
 Michele Lozzo
 Michele Ruiz
 Michelle Nunes
 Milena Fraga
 Milene Uehara
 Mirella Ferraz
 Mônica Nucci
 Monalisa Celeste
 Natália Premici
 Natalie Firmino
 Nathalie Guilmoto (Naty)
 Pâmela Carvalho
 Patty Beijo
 Patrícia Prado
 Patrícia Salvador
 Paula Liebert
 Paula Magalhães
 Poliana
 Pollyana Morbach (Polly)
 Priscila Annunciato
 Queila Arantes
 Rabech Lima
 Rafaella Viscardi
 Rebech Lima
 Renata Dias
 Renata Fukumura
 Renata Nomura
 Renata Ponte
 Renata Paschoal
 Renata Sayuri
 Re Zoéga
 Roberta (Beterraba)
 Roberta Carbone
 Rosane Muniz
 Sabrina Caldana
 Sabrina Rosa
 Sandra Garcia
 Sara Prado
 Selma Roth
 Silvia Burigo
 Simone Bayer
 Simone (Cacau)
 Simone Mattos
 Simone Siqueira
 Solange Cunha
 Sttephannie Morais
 Suelen Gongalves
 Suellen Barreto
 Talita Colucci
 Talita Paganotti (Talitinha)
 Tânia Mara
 Tatiana de Paiva
 Tatiane Cortês
 Tatiane Marques (Tati)
 Tati Hudson
 Thaís
 Thaís (2007 - 2008 version)
 Thais Ortega
 Vanessa Balsamo
 Vanessa Cesnik
 Vanessa Masan
 Vanessa Zotth
 Veronica
 Vick
 Vivian
 Vivi Fernandez
 Viviane Porto
 Wanessa Morgado
 Wanessa Siqueira

References

Portuguese-language television shows
Sistema Brasileiro de Televisão original programming
1997 Brazilian television series debuts
2000 Brazilian television series endings
2007 Brazilian television series debuts
2008 Brazilian television series endings
Television series revived after cancellation